Pigeon Island is part of the Great Barrier Reef Marine Park in Weymouth Bay north of Lockhart River and Kutini-Payamu National Park Cape York Peninsula, Queensland. It is around 2.5 hectares in size.

The island is a few hundred metres from the mouth of the Pascoe River.

References

Islands on the Great Barrier Reef